Klevetind Peak is a peak,  high, immediately south of Klevekampen Mountain in the Filchner Mountains of Queen Maud Land, Antarctica. It was photographed from the air by the Third German Antarctic Expedition (1938–39), was mapped from surveys and air photos by the Sixth Norwegian Antarctic Expedition (1956–60) and named Klevetind (the closet peak).

References

Mountains of Queen Maud Land
Princess Astrid Coast